Varyag (also spelled Variag; see Varangian for the meaning of the name) was a Russian protected cruiser. Varyag became famous for her crew's stoicism at the Battle of Chemulpo Bay.

Construction and design
In 1897, the Russian Admiralty, as part of a programme to reinforce the Imperial Russian Navy's Far East Fleet, published specifications for a fast protected cruiser, capable of commerce raiding. Russian shipyards were already busy, and the Imperial Admiralty placed an order with the American shipyard William Cramp & Sons of Philadelphia on 11 April 1898 to build a single cruiser, Varyag against this specification. Single ships were also ordered from the German shipyards Germaniawerft and AG Vulcan against these specifications. Varyag was laid down in October 1898, was launched on 31 October 1899 and commissioned into the Imperial Russian Navy on 2 January 1901, under the command of Captain Vladimir Behr.

 
As a protected cruiser, the main protection consisted of an arched armoured deck which protected the ship's engines and magazines. The ship's main armament was twelve Obukhoff 152 mm (6-inch) L/45 guns, with two guns side by side on the ship's forecastle, two side-by-side on the quarterdeck, and the remaining eight on sponsons on the ship's upper deck. Close-in defence was provided by four Hotchkiss 47 mm revolving cannon on fighting tops, with four more on the upper deck, backed up by two 37 mm guns and two machine guns. Two Baranowski 64 mm landing guns were also carried for on-shore use by the ship's marines. Six 381 mm (15 inch) torpedo tubes were carried, two on each broadside and one in the bow and stern.

During her construction, an assistant physician, Leo Alexandroff, left the ship's advance party on 20 April 1899, and applied for U.S. citizenship. He was arrested for desertion. His case reached the United States Supreme Court, which ruled in Tucker v. Alexandroff that the ship, though not accepted for service in the Imperial Russian Navy, was a warship under the terms of the 1832 treaty between Russia and the United States; this meant that Alexandroff would be returned to Russian authorities.

Service

During the Battle of Chemulpo Bay at the start of the Russo-Japanese War, Varyag (under the command of Captain of the First Rank Vsevolod Rudnev) found itself in battle, engaged with the heavily superior Japanese squadron of Admiral Uriu, (one armoured cruiser, five protected cruisers and eight destroyers) in a heroic attempt to break out from Chemulpo (Incheon) harbour 9 February 1904. Chemulpo was in neutral Korean waters. Admiral Uriu gave the Russian ships in harbor a written ultimatum to sail by 12:00 noon or be attacked in the harbor itself. Captain Rudnev sortied, accompanied by the gunboat Koreets; having lost 31 men dead, 191 injured (out of 570) and outgunned, both ships returned to harbor by 1:00 p.m., the crew decided not to surrender, but to sink the ship.

In 1907, Vsevolod Rudnev (by that time dismissed from Russian naval service in the rank of rear admiral) was decorated with the Japanese Order of the Rising Sun for his heroism in that battle; although he accepted the order, he never wore it in public.

Varyag was later salvaged by the Japanese and repaired. She served with the Imperial Japanese Navy as the protected cruiser .

During World War I, Russia and Japan were allies and several ships were transferred by the Japanese to the Russians. She was repurchased by the Imperial Russian Navy at Vladivostok on 5 April 1916 and renamed back to Varyag. In June, she departed for Murmansk via the Indian Ocean, arriving in November 1916. She was sent to Liverpool in Great Britain for an overhaul by Cammell Laird in February 1917, and was due to re-enter service with the Arctic squadron of the Russian Navy. However, following the Russian October Revolution on 7 November 1917, crewmen who had remained onboard hoisted the red flag and refused to set sail. On 8 December 1917 she was seized by a detachment of British soldiers. Assigned to the Royal Navy in February 1918, she ran aground while under tow off of Ireland, but was refloated and used as a hulk until 1919. She was then sold to a German firm in 1920 for scrap, but on 5 February 1920 ran aground on rocks near the Scottish village of Lendalfoot in the Firth of Clyde, while being towed to Germany. She was scrapped in place from 1923 to 1925.

Legacy

The stoicism of Varyags crew at Chemulpo has inspired the Austrian poet Rudolf Greinz to write a poem dedicated to Varyag. The Russian translation of this poem was put to music by A.S. Turischev. The result was the 1904 song that remains popular today:

(German original)
Auf Deck, Kameraden, all' auf Deck!
Heraus zur letzten Parade!
Der stolze Warjag ergibt sich nicht,
Wir brauchen keine Gnade!
Rudolf Greinz

(Russian poetic translation)
Наверх вы, товарищи, все по местам!
Последний парад наступает.
Врагу не сдается наш гордый “Варяг”,
Пощады никто не желает. 

(translation)
Get up you comrades, take your places,
The final parade is at hand.
Proud "Varyag" will not surrender to the enemy,
No one wants their mercy.

On Sunday 30 July 2006 (Russian Navy Day), a memorial plaque to the cruiser was unveiled at Lendalfoot in a ceremony attended by senior Russian politicians and navy personnel, veterans and local dignitaries.

On 8 September 2007 a monument in the form of a large bronze cross was unveiled as an addition to the Lendalfoot memorial, in a ceremony attended by former Nato Secretary General George Robertson, British and Russian navy officers and diplomats. The “Cruiser Varyag” Charity Foundation had organised a competition in Russia for the design of the monument.

In 2010, as a gesture marking the 20th anniversary of diplomatic relations between Korea and Russia, the flag of Varyag was restored.  The Japanese Navy recovered the flag when the ship was salvaged; and the Incheon Metropolitan Museum acquired them after Japan's defeat at the end of World War II.  The return of the flag takes the form of a two-year renewable loan because of the Korean law protecting cultural assets.

In 2018, the Russian heavy metal band Aria in their album "Proklyatie Morey" ("Curse of the seas") included the song "Varyag", which recounts the engagement.

Notes

References 

 Kowner, Rotem (2006). "Historical Dictionary of the Russo-Japanese War". Scarecrow. 620pp. 
 MPHK Catalogue of collectible silver coins 2012-13 p.38
 

Cruisers of the Imperial Russian Navy
Ships built by William Cramp & Sons
1899 ships
Naval ships of Russia
Russo-Japanese War cruisers of Russia
World War I cruisers of Russia
Shipwrecks in the Firth of Clyde
Maritime incidents in 1904
Maritime incidents in 1920
1920 in Scotland
1925 in Scotland